Julio César Luna Fermín (born January 7, 1973 in Maturín, Monagas) is a male weightlifter from Venezuela. He competed in four consecutive Summer Olympics for his native South American country during his career, starting in 1992. Luña carried the flag for Venezuela at the opening ceremony of the 2004 Summer Olympics in Athens, Greece.

References

1973 births
Living people
People from Maturín
Venezuelan male weightlifters
Weightlifters at the 1992 Summer Olympics
Weightlifters at the 1996 Summer Olympics
Weightlifters at the 2000 Summer Olympics
Weightlifters at the 2004 Summer Olympics
Weightlifters at the 1991 Pan American Games
Weightlifters at the 1995 Pan American Games
Weightlifters at the 1999 Pan American Games
Weightlifters at the 2003 Pan American Games
Weightlifters at the 2007 Pan American Games
Weightlifters at the 2011 Pan American Games
Olympic weightlifters of Venezuela
Pan American Games gold medalists for Venezuela
Pan American Games silver medalists for Venezuela
Pan American Games bronze medalists for Venezuela
Pan American Games medalists in weightlifting
Central American and Caribbean Games silver medalists for Venezuela
Competitors at the 2006 Central American and Caribbean Games
South American Games silver medalists for Venezuela
South American Games medalists in weightlifting
Competitors at the 2010 South American Games
Central American and Caribbean Games medalists in weightlifting
Medalists at the 1995 Pan American Games
Medalists at the 2007 Pan American Games
Medalists at the 2011 Pan American Games
20th-century Venezuelan people
21st-century Venezuelan people